The term "National Treasure" has been used in Japan to denote cultural properties since 1897.
The definition and the criteria have changed since the inception of the term. These paintings adhere to the current definition, and were designated national treasures when the Law for the Protection of Cultural Properties was implemented on June 9, 1951. As such, they are restricted in transfer and may not be exported. Owners are required to announce any changes to the National Treasures such as damage or loss and need to obtain a permit for changes in location, transfer of ownership or intended repairs. The items are selected by the Ministry of Education, Culture, Sports, Science and Technology based on their "especially high historical or artistic value". This list contains 166 paintings from 7th-century Asuka period to the early modern 19th-century Edo period. In fact the number of paintings presented is more than 166, because in some cases groups of related paintings are combined to form a single entry. The paintings listed show Buddhist themes, landscapes, portraits and court scenes. Some of the paintings were imported directly from China. The titles of the works are descriptive rather than the artists' titles; therefore it is possible to find alternate names in the literature for a given work.

Beginning in the mid-6th century, as Buddhism was brought to Japan from Baekje, religious art was introduced from the mainland. The earliest religious paintings in Japan were copied using mainland styles and techniques, and are similar to the art of the Chinese Sui dynasty (581–618) or the late Sixteen Kingdoms around the early 5th century. They comprise the oldest extant non-primitive paintings in Japan. By the mid-Nara period (ca. 750) Japanese paintings showed influences of the Chinese Tang dynasty (618–907) and in the 9th century early Heian period evolved into the Kara-e genre. Wall murals in the Takamatsuzuka Tomb, the Kitora Tomb and the Portrait of Kichijōten at Yakushi-ji exemplify the Kara-e style. Generally, Nara period paintings show religious subjects, and the artists are unknown. During that period, sculptures rather than paintings were more prevalent.

Mandalas became predominant in the paintings of the early Heian period as esoteric Buddhism emerged with the Shingon and Tendai sects in the 8th and 9th centuries. The evolution of Pure Land Buddhism caused raigō-zu to be developed as a genre, characterised by depictions of the Amida welcoming the souls of the faithful to his Western Paradise as seen in a 1053 painting in the Phoenix-Hall of Byōdō-in. By the mid-Heian period, Chinese style kara-e painting was replaced with the classical Japanese yamato-e style, in which the images were painted primarily on sliding screens and byōbu folding screens. At the close of the Heian period around 1185, the practice of adorning emakimono hand scrolls with yamato-e paintings flourished. Examples of illustrated hand scrolls include novels such as Genji Monogatari Emaki, historical writings like The Tale of Great Minister Ban, or religious works such as the Scroll of Hungry Ghosts. These genres continued to be produced into the Kamakura period from 1185 to 1333. As during the Nara period, sculpture remained the preferred art form of the period.

Influenced by the Chinese Song and Yuan dynasties, Japanese monochrome ink painting called suibokuga largely replaced polychrome scroll paintings. By the end of the 14th century, monochrome landscape paintings (sansuiga) became the preferred genre for Zen painters, evolving to a unique Japanese style from the Chinese origin. Shūbun, who created Reading in a Bamboo Grove (1446), and his student Sesshū, author of Landscape of the Four Seasons, are the most well known priest-painters of the period. As with most of the early Japanese paintings, these works were created for Buddhist temples. At the end of the Muromachi period around 1573, ink painting had migrated out of the Zen monasteries, and was practised by artists from the Kanō school.

In contrast to the previous period, the paintings of the Momoyama period  were characterised by a grandiose polychrome style with extensive use of gold and silver foil. Large scale paintings were commissioned to adorn the castles and palaces of the military rulers. The Kanō school, patronized by the ruling class, was the most influential school of the period and, with 300 years of dominance, endured for the longest period in the history of Japanese painting.
The trends of large polychrome paintings continued into the Edo period (1603–1868). The Rinpa school, best represented by Tawaraya Sōtatsu and Ogata Kōrin, used vibrant colors to depict classical themes from Japanese literature and Heian period poetry. In the 18th century, paintings of Yuan dynasty scholar-amateur painters were brought to Japan and imitated, giving rise to the Nanga or Bunjinga style of painting. Two of the most prominent painters of this school were Ike no Taiga and Yosa Buson.

Statistics
The 166 entries in the list consist of the following: 92 are hanging scrolls; 40 are hand scrolls or emakimono; 24 are byōbu folding screens or paintings on fusuma sliding doors; five are murals; and three are albums. Two items, the portrait of Kichijōten and Illustrated Biography of Prince Shōtoku do not fall in any of these categories. The paintings are located in museums, Buddhist temples, Shinto shrines, private collections, a university and two are located in tombs (Takamatsuzuka Tomb and Kitora Tomb). A large proportion of items are housed in the national museums of Tokyo, Kyoto and Nara. The city containing the greatest number of National Treasure paintings is Kyoto with 51 and Tokyo with 51 of which 28 are located in the Tokyo National Museum which is the structure housing the most painting National Treasures.

Usage
An overview of what is included in the table and the manner of sorting is as follows: the columns (with the exceptions of Remarks and Pictures) are sortable by pressing the arrows symbols.
Name: the name as registered in the Database of National Cultural Properties
Author: the name of the artist and—if applicable—name of the person who added an inscription
Remarks: detailed location, provenance, general remarks
Date: period and year; The column entries sort by year. If only a period is known, they sort by the start year of that period.
Format: primary type of painting, technique and dimensions; The column entries sort by the main type and in some cases further by subcategories: album; byōbu (2 section -> pair or single, 6 section -> pair or single, 8 section -> pair or single); hand scroll (emakimono other); hanging scroll (mandala, portrait, deity, landscape, other); mural; other.
Present location: "building-name temple/museum/shrine-name town-name prefecture-name"; The column entries sort as "prefecture-name town-name temple/museum/shrine-name building-name".
Image: picture of the painting, or of a characteristic painting in a group of paintings

Treasures

See also
Japanese painting
Nara Research Institute for Cultural Properties
Tokyo Research Institute for Cultural Properties
Independent Administrative Institution National Museum

References

Bibliography

.

 

Paintings
Lists of works of art
Japanese painting
Chinese paintings

Lists of paintings